Cablecasting Limited (CL Systems Limited) was Canada's fifth largest cable television company serving cities in western Canada and some small towns in Ontario. The two major shareholders of the company were David R. Graham, who owned 99.1%, and Noel R. Bambrough who owned 0.1%.

They owned cable facilities in the following markets:

 Greater Winnipeg Cablevision
 Calgary Cable TV/FM (served Calgary North)
 Airdrie, Alberta
 Cochrane, Alberta
 Tillsonburg, Ontario
 Thames Cablevision of Strathroy, Ontario
 Allview Cable Service of St. Thomas, Ontario
 Graham Cable serving City of York and parts of Toronto
 Lakeshore Community Television serving Terrace Bay, White River, Red Rock, Nipigon, Marathon, Manitouwadge and Wawa, Ontario.

History

In May, 1980, a U.S. subsidiary of Cable America Inc., Cablecasting Ltd. bought up 80% of a cable company in the state of Dekalb Cablevision Inc., serving 16,000 households in De Kalb, Georgia.

Before SHAW Communications bought up these assets for $307,500,000 in 1992, Cablecasting Limited had 320,000 subscribers in the systems listed above. It was the fifth largest cable company in Canada.

CRTC License-related 
 CRTC Decision 1992-829 - Sale of Cablecasting Limited assets to SHAW Cable

See also 

Classicomm

References

External links 
http://edgar.secdatabase.com/2970/101270902000563/filing-main.htm SEC Filing for Intacta Technologies Ltd.] Noel R. Bambrough was CEO of this company after leaving Cablecasting Ltd.

Defunct cable and DBS companies of Canada